Hantec is a unique dialect previously spoken among lower classes in Brno, Czech Republic during the 19th and early 20th centuries. It developed from the mixing of the Czech language as spoken in Moravia with the languages of other residents of Brno, including Germans and Jews. Today Hantec exists in its original form only among some elderly people, but many words and expressions have become a part of Czech spoken in Brno.

Phrases

Nouns

See also

Moravian dialects

References

External links
 Czech-Hantec dictionary
 Website about hantec

Slang
Czech language
Brno
City colloquials